Just Married is a 1928 American comedy silent film directed by Frank R. Strayer and written by Frank Butler, George Marion Jr., Adelaide Matthews, Anne Nichols and Gilbert Pratt. The film stars James Hall, Ruth Taylor, Harrison Ford, William Austin, Ivy Harris, Tom Ricketts and Maude Turner Gordon. The film was released on August 18, 1928, by Paramount Pictures.

Plot
After many ridiculous moments, a young girl marries her former acquaintance, not her fiancée.

Cast 
James Hall as Bob Adams
Ruth Taylor as Roberta
Harrison Ford as Jack Stanley
William Austin as Percy Jones
Ivy Harris as Mrs. Jack Stanley
Tom Ricketts as Makepeace Witter
Maude Turner Gordon as Mrs. Witter
Lila Lee as Victoire
Arthur Hoyt as Steward
Wade Boteler as Purser
Mario Carillo as Magnoir

References

External links 
 

1928 films
1920s English-language films
Silent American comedy films
1928 comedy films
Paramount Pictures films
Films directed by Frank R. Strayer
American black-and-white films
American silent feature films
1920s American films